= CableU =

- Logo of CableU
- Company type: Limited Liability Company
- Industry: Cable media
- Founded: 2006
- Headquarters: Norwalk, Connecticut, United States
- Website: www.cableu.tv

CableU was an online subscription-based service that monitors and analyzes cable network performance and programming trends. The website was founded in December 2006 by Gary Lico of CABLEready. When CABLEready closed in 2013, CableU closed also.
